Christian Tauson (21 February 1885 – 24 November 1974) was a Danish sports shooter. He competed in 300 metre free rifle, three positions event at the 1912 Summer Olympics.

References

1885 births
1974 deaths
Danish male sport shooters
Olympic shooters of Denmark
Shooters at the 1912 Summer Olympics
Sportspeople from Copenhagen